Jerry Cartwright may refer to:

Jerry Cartwright, designer of RX II
Jerry Cartwright, character in 31 North 62 East